Storm Over Tibet is a 1952 American adventure film directed by Andrew Marton and starring Rex Reason and Diana Douglas.

Plot
During World War II, David Simms pilots supplies between India and China over the Himalaya Mountains.

Cast
 Rex Reason as David Simms 
 Diana Douglas as Elaine March Simms
 Myron Healey as Bill March (as Myron Healy)
 Robert Karnes as Radio Operator
 Strother Martin as Co-pilot
 Harold Fong as Sergeant Lee 
 Harold Dyrenforth as Professor Faber
 Jarmila Marton as Mrs. Faber
 William Schallert as Aylen
 John Dodsworth as Malloy
 Marcella Concepcion as High Lama (as M. Concepcion)

Production
The film used footage filmed by Andrew Marton of the 1934 International Himalayan Expedition led by Norman Dyrenforth, whose son Harold Dyrenforth played a character based on his father.  Much of the footage appeared in Marton's 1935 Swiss-German film Demon of the Himalayas with some sequences reused by Columbia in their 1937 film Lost Horizon. Actor Rex Reason made his debut in the film telling an interviewer he was chosen for his role because the film needed an actor who could physically fit the shots of the previous actor who had died. Reason's 27 minutes of footage included climbing sequences filmed in an indoor studio using white painted corn flakes as snow.

Arthur Honegger reused some of his score from Demon of the Himalayas.

See also
 List of American films of 1952

References

Bibliography
 Greene, Naomi. From Fu Manchu to Kung Fu Panda: Images of China in American Film. Hong Kong University Press, 2014.

External links
 

1952 films
1952 adventure films
1950s English-language films
American adventure films
Films directed by Andrew Marton
Mountaineering films
American remakes of foreign films
American remakes of German films
Columbia Pictures films
Films about Tibet
Films scored by Leith Stevens
Films set in the Himalayas
American black-and-white films
1950s American films